Parliamentary elections were held in Iceland on 21 October 1916. Voters elected all 26 seats in the Lower House of the Althing and eight of the fourteen seats in Upper House, the other six having been elected in August. The Home Rule Party emerged as the largest party in the Lower House of the Althing, winning eight of the 26 seats.

Results

Notes

References

1916 10
Iceland
Parliament 2
Iceland